Joseph Kibongé Mafu (born 12 February 1945) is a Congolese football midfielder who played for Zaire in the 1974 FIFA World Cup. He also played for AS Vita Club. In 1967, he appeared for the national team in two friendlies versus Pelé and his club Santos FC in Kinshasa.

References

External links

1945 births
Africa Cup of Nations-winning players
Democratic Republic of the Congo footballers
Democratic Republic of the Congo international footballers
Association football midfielders
AS Vita Club players
1974 FIFA World Cup players
1965 African Cup of Nations players
1968 African Cup of Nations players
1970 African Cup of Nations players
1974 African Cup of Nations players
Living people
Footballers from Kinshasa
21st-century Democratic Republic of the Congo people